Senino is a rural locality (a village) in Zelentsovskoye Rural Settlement, Nikolsky District, Vologda Oblast, Russia. The population was 52 as of 2002.

Geography 
Senino is located 61 km northwest of Nikolsk (the district's administrative centre) by road. Perebor is the nearest rural locality.

References 

Rural localities in Nikolsky District, Vologda Oblast